Elections to the Legislative Assembly of the Indian Union Territory of Pondicherry took place on 23 August 1964 to constitute the Second Assembly of Pondicherry. These were the first Legislative Assembly elections after the formation of the new Union Territory. The elections marked the end of the rule of Edouard Goubert in Pondicherry.

Outgoing Assembly
The outgoing Legislative Assembly had 39 members (out of whom 25 belonged to the Indian National Congress, 11 to the People's Front (Makkaḷ Munnaṇi (Tamil:மக்கள் முன்னணி), 1 to the Praja Socialist Party and 2 independents).

Delimitation
As per The Union Territories Act, 1963, thirty members would be elected through direct suffrage.
Before the Elections to the Pondicherry Legislative Assembly were held in August 1964, the constituencies were delimited by the Delimitation Commission (as per Delimitation Commission Act, 1962) and the entire territory was divided into 30 single-member constituencies-21 for Pondicherry region, 6 for Karaikal region, 2 for Mahe region and 1 for Yanam region. Out of these 5 seats were reserved for Scheduled Castes, four in Pondicherry region and one in Karaikal region.

Contenders
A total of 85 candidates contested the election. Three of the candidates were women (Saraswathi Subbiah of the People's Front, P. Angammal and Padmini Chandrasekaran from the Congress Party).

Congress Party
In the run-up to the election, there was dissent within the local unit of the Indian National Congress over the nomination of candidates. Until these polls Édouard Goubert had maintained control over the local Congress Party apparatus. Goubert had been pro-colonialist who had switched sides just as French power ended in Pondicherry. He had survived politically through political intrigues and maintaining the image that he could keep the communists from seizing power in the Union Territory. Now a group led by V. Venkatasubha Reddiar challenged his hegemony. Reddiar had been the Minister of Planning in the Pondicherry cabinet since 1954, and enjoyed the support by a sector of contractors and bootleggers. K. Kamaraj, the president of the Congress Party in the Madras State, was called on to heal the split. The Madras State Minister for Industries R. Venkataraman (acting on behalf of the All India Congress Committee) was assigned the task to ensure that the party was reunited for the polls. The AICC wholeheartedly sided with Reddiar. Effectively Goubert's group was marginalised in the process. The Congress Party contested all 30 seat in the election. However, Goubert organised some of his sympathizers to contest as independents. In total there were 38 independent candidates, including Goubert's followers.

People's Front
Apart from the intra-Congress conflict, the main contender was the communist-led People's Front. The People's Front contested 17 out of the 30 seats.

Result
The Congress Party candidates obtained 91,338 votes (54.3%), the People's Front 30,495 votes (18.2%) and independents gathered 46,218 votes (27.58%). One candidate, Kamishetty Sri Parasurama Vara Prasada Rao Naidu (Congress), was elected unopposed from the Yanam constituency. 17 out of the 22 Congress candidates elected belonged to the Reddiar group, the remaining five were part of the Goubert group. Another three pro-Goubert independents were elected.

Reddiar himself won the Nettapacom seat with 4,965 votes (83.54% of the votes in the constituency). Goubert won the Raj Nivas seat, with 2,722 votes (78.47%) A fourth independent (unaffiliated with Goubert) also emerged victorious. Four People's Front candidates were elected, a result which was seen as a backlash for the communists. Amongst the elected People's Front members was V. Subbiah, who won the Modeliarpeth seat with 3,878 votes (51.80%).

The results of 1964 election were summarized below

List of winners

Election of CM
A meeting of the members of Pondicherry Congress Legislature Party to elect its new Leader was held on 31 August 1964. R. Venkatraman, then Minister of Industries, Madras was presentin the meeting as Observer of the AICC. VenkataSubba Reddiar elected was unanimously elected Leader.

New assembly and cabinet
After the election the Congress Party formed a four-member cabinet led by Reddiar. Likewise Reddiar was elected, unanimously, as the leader of the Congress Legislature Party in the new assembly.

See also

Puducherry Legislative Assembly
1955 Pondicherry Representative Assembly election
1959 Pondicherry Representative Assembly election
Second Assembly of Pondicherry

References

Notes

Pondicherry
State Assembly elections in Puducherry
1960s in Pondicherry